El gran teatro (Spanish: "The Great Theatre" or "The Grand Theatre") is a 1979 novel by Argentine writer Manuel Mujica Lainez, part of his Buenos Aires series.

The whole action of the novel takes place during a performance of Wagner's Parsifal at Buenos Aires' famous opera house, the Teatro Colón.

The Colón is, emblematically and par excellence, The Great Theatre, a giant and impossibly splendiferous jewellery box built, in an improbable bygone age, for a glitteringly self-assured class of leaders (or, alternatively, disgusting show-offs) to show itself off.

1979 Argentine novels
Novels by Manuel Mujica Lainez
Novels set in Buenos Aires